Walter Keller (28 October 1933 – 16 December 2015) was a Swiss ice hockey player who competed for the Swiss national team at the 1956 Winter Olympics in Cortina d'Ampezzo.

References

External links
Walter Keller statistics at Sports-Reference.com

1933 births
2015 deaths
Ice hockey players at the 1956 Winter Olympics
Olympic ice hockey players of Switzerland
Swiss ice hockey left wingers